Dennis M. Jones (September 12, 1938 – September 20, 2016) was an American businessman and pharmaceutical magnate, best known as the founder of Jones Pharma and Dennis M. Jones Family Foundation.

Early life and education
Jones was born in Terre Haute, Indiana, in 1938, the son of a farm equipment dealer and a registered nurse. The family moved to Marshall, Illinois when he was a young boy. As early as age 10, Dennis was helping out with the family business, sweeping floors and dusting the sales barn at his father's farm implements dealership. By high school, Dennis was earning about 25 cents an hour, or $15 a week, and paying his parents $12 a week for room and board, leaving him $3 per week to buy school lunches and enjoy 75 cents of spending money. He considered those valuable learning experiences about business and the value of money.

As a teenager, Dennis’ father often took him to St. Louis for trade shows where he experienced first-hand the polished side of business and the art of salesmanship. He also read books about business and success, including Dale Carnegie’s How to Win Friends and Influence People. Dennis wasn’t a particularly good student, and after graduating from high school in 1956, college was not an option because his parents could not afford it. He worked for a year at Ford Motor Company in Chicago Heights, Illinois, and then enlisted in the U.S. Marine Corps.

In 1958, a year after enlisting, he married his high school sweetheart, Judy Pearce, who was from a more affluent area. Dennis wanted to run in her social circles and eventually provide her with the lifestyle she was accustomed to. Dennis and Judy began their married life in a trailer home.
Dennis knew he wanted to start a career in pharmaceutical sales early on. He thought because of his farm equipment sales exposure, sales would be the best way to provide for the family.

Upon his return to the U.S. in 1961, he worked for Rockford Life Insurance Company, where he stayed for three years, eventually becoming the youngest district sales manager in the company’s history.During that time, he met Jim O’Neal who had just started his own company. Jim O’Neal was impressed with Jones and hired him in sales for his upstart pharmaceutical company, Sig: Laboratories. After a few years, O’Neal sold the company to a subsidiary of Revlon. O’Neal and Jones formed OJF Pharmaceutical Sales company, which in 1978, was acquired by Chromalloy American Corporation.

Jones Pharma
Dennis and Judy Jones gathered their entire savings, $100,000, along with an additional $200,000 from friends, and founded Jones Medical, later renamed Jones Pharma, on March 16, 1981. The idea was to purchase products and companies, eliminate duplicate overhead, and make profitable acquisitions.

Jones Pharma looked for products large companies didn't have time to promote – successful products that, with some aggressive marketing, could prove to be extremely profitable. In the process of starting Jones Pharma, Dennis is credited with creating a new business model: the emerging specialty pharmaceutical group which has since been copied by other companies.

In the beginning, Jones Pharma consisted of Dennis and Judy Jones and one other employee. Within two years, two of his brothers joined (they later left for other ventures), and the company began making acquisitions. At its pinnacle, Jones Pharma employed 600 people in five plants located in Phoenix, Arizona, St. Petersburg, Florida, Canton, Ohio, Madison, Wisconsin, and St. Louis, Missouri.

By 1999, they had made 19 acquisitions. Jones acquired a product named Thrombin USP, a hemostat that acts as a clotting agent in surgery. They tenaciously marketed the product and it wasn't long before sales of Thrombin surpassed similar products at Parke Davis and Johnson & Johnson, eventually driving both out of the market. The company completed its initial public offering in 1986, trading under the ticker symbol JMED on the NASDAQ. For a decade in the 1990s, with Dennis as the Chairman and CEO, Jones Pharma's return to investors was the largest of any pharmaceutical company and the second largest on Wall Street.

In the summer of 2000, the Joneses decided to sell the company to King Pharmaceuticals, based in Bristol, TN for $3.4 billion, an all-time record price for a company with annual sales of $200 million. According to public filings, the vast majority of the company sales proceeds were realized by the company's 600 employees and other public shareholders. Jones initiated one of the first employee stock option programs in the pharmaceutical industry.

Post business life
After selling Jones Pharma, the Joneses retired in Ladue, a suburban St. Louis community. In 2014, Dennis and Judy Jones ordered the build of a $34 million, 164 ft. motor yacht – D’Natalin IV - by U.S. yacht builder, Christiansen Yachts. Jones died in St. Louis, Missouri on September 20, 2016.

Philanthropy
The Dennis M. Jones Family Foundation is a St. Louis, Missouri-based foundation with a mission to support initiatives which empower individuals to succeed in life, with a focus on providing scholarships to underprivileged students. It was founded in 2000, and since then, more than $35 million has been contributed to charitable causes including civic organizations, education, Marines & Veterans, fighting homelessness, fighting poverty, and many others.

The largest cumulative donations include $4.8 million to Connections to Success, which helps ex-offenders develop job skills and land interviews, $3.8 million to Junior Achievement, $2.5 million to the St. Louis College of Pharmacy, $2.2 million to Forest Park Forever, and $2.0 million to the St. Louis Zoo. The foundation is focused heavily on promoting the growth and education of underprivileged children mainly through scholarships. It has contributed heavily to Saint Louis University, the Roman Catholic Foundation, and Ranken Technical College.

Two recent programs include the Jones Scholars, 76 children who received full scholarships to attend four inner city Catholic schools (administered by the Roman Catholic Foundation and the Today and Tomorrow Educational foundation), and Ranken Technical College. The foundation was funded with 1,000,000 shares of King Pharmaceuticals and converted into cash through the public sales of the shares at $52 per share.

Recognition
Dennis Jones has been recognized throughout his life for achievements in business and civic involvement. Some of these awards include:
 EY Entrepreneur of the Year] (2006) which recognizes the endeavors of exceptional men and women who create the products and services that keep the worldwide economy moving forward
 Variety the Children's Charity of St. Louis Man of the Year (2004) which recognizes St. Louis philanthropists who play an active role in shaping the local community
 Junior Achievement St. Louis Business Hall of Fame Laureate which highlights the lives of St. Louis businessmen and women, who through their success in business and life have made St. Louis an outstanding community.
 Jones Pharma recognized as one of best performing stocks of the decade of the 1990s - Los Angeles Times.
 Dennis Jones rang the closing bell at the New York Stock Exchange on August 30, 2000.

References

Other sources
 Socha, Rudy & Darrow, Carolyn (2003). "Above and Beyond: Former Marines Conquer the Civilian World", p. 110. Turner Publishing, Paducha. 
 King Pharmaceuticals merging with Jones Pharma in $3.4 Billion Deal
 St. Louis Business Journal: He’s a multimillionaire who never went to college, yet within 20 years built Jones Pharma into a business that was acquired for $3.4 billion
 New York Times: Seeing a Supersize Yacht as a Job Engine, Not a Self-Indulgence
 Wall Street Journal: Vonnegut: When It's Time to Discuss Charity

1938 births
2016 deaths
American businesspeople